Aghadowey is a townland in east County Londonderry, Northern Ireland. It lies in Aghadowey civil parish, and is part of Causeway Coast and Glens district. It is close to the county boundary with County Antrim.

Sport
Aghadowey is a popular angling area, with anglers fishing both the River Bann and the Agivey River. 
Aghadowey Stadium hosts regular motorcycle racing and stock car racing also rallying as a RallySport Association event, on the disused World War II airfield. Aghadowey was the home circuit (1.003 miles/1.614 km) of the Motor Cycle Road Racing Club of Ireland (MCRRCI) (now Bishopscourt Race Circuit near Downpatrick) and was first used for racing in 1975, after the club was forced to vacate their previous circuit at Maghaberry to make way for a new prison development.
Aghadowey fc was founded in 1968 when the coleraine and district league formed, before this they played as Agivey. They have notable rivalries with both Garvagh FC and Kilrea FC and have scored victories over both in recent years.

Transport
Aghadowey railway station opened on 19 February 1880, but closed on 28 August 1950.

See also 

List of villages in Northern Ireland
List of towns in Northern Ireland

References 

Villages in County Londonderry
Causeway Coast and Glens district